Heidi is a 1993 American two-part, three-hour television miniseries based on the classic Swiss 1881 novel of the same name by Johanna Spyri, which has sold over 50 million copies  and has been adapted for film and television nearly 20 times. Heidi originally aired on the Disney Channel on July 18 and 19, 1993, and stars Noley Thornton in the title role.

Plot
At the beginning of part one of the miniseries, John and Adelheid are killed in a tree accident following an argument with John's father, Tobias. Their infant daughter, Heidi, survives the accident. Eight years later, Heidi is being raised by her cousin Dete in Switzerland following the death of her parents. Dete soon becomes selfish and unwilling to incur the costs of raising Heidi. Dete decides to take Heidi to live in the Alps with her grandfather. Still distraught over the death of his son, he initially resents Heidi's presence. However, as the story progresses, Heidi's innocence and charm break through her grandfather's tough exterior, and she also makes friends with a young goat herder named Peter. Later, Heidi's charmed life falls apart. Dete comes to take her away from her grandfather, placing her with a wealthy family in Frankfurt. She is enlisted as a companion for Klara, a wheelchair-using girl who is considered an invalid by her family. Heidi manages to spread her joyous disposition in this environment as well.

In part two, three months have passed and Heidi continues to live in Frankfurt. However, she becomes very homesick. After finding Heidi sleepwalking one night, the Doctor tells Herr Sesemann that Heidi needs to be sent back to the Alps, otherwise, she will become much worse.  Reluctant for her friend to leave and become lonely again, Klara agrees to let Heidi return to the Alps, in return for that Heidi promises to come back to Frankfurt after a month once she feels better. Heidi returns to the Alps and regains her energy back. During her return, she sends a letter to Klara with two requests: to come to the mountains and visit her, as well as for the doctor to check on Grandmother. Honouring her requests, Klara sends the doctor to check up on Grandmother. However, due to her age, the doctor is unable to care for her. Before dying, Grandmother asks to Heidi to promise to remember her and to look inside of herself. Later, Klara comes to visit Heidi while Peter gives both girls the cold shoulder and pushes Klara's wheelchair which causes it to break. While visiting the Lady of the Mountain, Heidi tries to convince Klara that they should both live their own lives after remembering Grandmother's final words to her and that they will always be friends. Klara becomes upset, calls Heidi a liar and confesses that she hates her. Walking away, Heidi nearly falls off a cliff, but is rescued by Peter and Klara. Returning, Klara takes Heidi's words to heart and finds the strength to walk again. The children then part ways. Heidi convinces Peter to go to school and continues her life with her grandfather, telling him she loves him and she's finally home.

Cast

 Noley Thornton as Heidi
 Jason Robards as Grandfather Tobias
 Jane Seymour as Fraulein Rottenmeier
 Siân Phillips as Frau Sesemann
 Andrew Bicknell as Herr Herbert Sesemann
 Lexi Randall as Klara
 Edward Highmore as Herr Kandidat
 Basil Hoskins as Sebastian
 Michael Simkins as Dr Friedrich
 Jane Hazlegrove as Cousin Dete
 Benjamin Brazier as Peter
 Patricia Neal as Grandmother
 Catherine Punch as Tinette
 Daniel Flynn as John
 Annemarie Bubke as Adelheid
 John Quentin as Pastor

Production
The series was shot in both Salzburg and Tirol in Austria. The Church is the St. Nikolauskirche, Bichl, Matrei, Osttirol.

Release
Heidi aired on the Disney Channel  in two parts on July 18 and 19, 1993.

Reception
Reviews of the series were generally positive, with praise for the performance of Noley Thornton as Heidi. A review in the Chicago Tribune describes Thornton's work as an "outstanding performance as the girl who has the innate ability to change people's lives." Gary Marsh, vice president of original programming for the Disney Channel, says that Thornton did not play the typical happy, carefree role of Heidi. "She is not the happy-go-lucky, carefree waif played by Shirley Temple, who frolics through life making everybody happy. She's an orphan in a desperate search for a permanent home."

The Philadelphia Inquirer lauded the miniseries for its lavish production when compared to previous adaptations. Lee Winfrey wrote "the new Heidi is an elaborate and elegant production."

Accolades
These factors led to the show being nominated for best miniseries or TV Film in the 51st Golden Globe Awards.

References

External links 
 
 
 
 Heidi at Rotten Tomatoes
 Disney Movies

1993 American television series debuts
1993 American television series endings
1990s American television miniseries
Disney Channel original programming
English-language television shows
Heidi television series
Television series about orphans
Television shows set in Frankfurt
Television shows set in Switzerland